Elections to Liverpool City Council were held on Thursday 1 November 1899. One third of the council seats were up for election, the term of office of each councillor being three years.

Eleven of the thirty-one seats (29 wards, with a new ward of Sefton Park East electing three new councillors) were uncontested.

After the election, the composition of the council was:

Election result

Ward results

* - Retiring Councillor seeking re-election

Comparisons are made with the 1896 election results, as the retiring councillors were elected in that year.

Abercromby

Breckfield

Brunswick

Castle Street

Dingle

Edge Hill

Everton

Exchange

Fairfield

Granby

Great George

Kensington

Kirkdale

Low Hill

Netherfield

North Scotland

North Walton

Prince's Park

Sandhills

St. Anne's

St. Domingo

St. Peter's

Sefton Park East

Sefton Park West

South Scotland

South Walton

Vauxhall

Wavertree

West Derby

By-elections

No. 24 Sefton Park West, November 1899

The resignation of Councillor Francis Henderson (Conservative, Sefton Park West, elected 1 November 1898) was reported to the Council on 9 November 1899
.

No. 17, St. Anne's, November 1899

The resignation of Councillor Jacob Reuben Grant (Liberal, St. Anne's, elected 1 November 1897) was reported to the Council on 9 November 1899
.

No.19, St. Peter's, November 1899

The resignation of Alderman Henry Hugh Hornby
(Liberal Unionist, elected by the council 9 November 1898) was reported to the Council on 9 November 1899
.

Councillor William Henry Watts (Liberal, St. Peter's, elected 1897) was elected as an alderman by the council on 9 November 1899.

No.23 Prince's Park, November 1899

On the addition of No. 24a Sefton Park East ward,
Councillor William James Burgess (Conservative, Prince's Park, elected 1 November 1897) was elected as an alderman by the council on 9 November 1899.

No. 4, Fairfield ward, 15 May 1900

Caused by the resignation of Councillor Frank John Leslie (Conservative, Fairfield, elected 1 November 1899).

See also

 Liverpool City Council
 Liverpool Town Council elections 1835 - 1879
 Liverpool City Council elections 1880–present
 Mayors and Lord Mayors of Liverpool 1207 to present
 History of local government in England

References

1899
1899 English local elections
1890s in Liverpool